The Kasteelcross Zonnebeke is a cyclo-cross race held in Zonnebeke, Belgium every January.

Past winners

Men

Women

References
 Results

Cycle races in Belgium
Cyclo-cross races
Recurring sporting events established in 1987
1987 establishments in Belgium
Sport in West Flanders